Tyrone Nurse (born 4 January 1990) is a British professional boxer. He held the British super lightweight title from 2015 to 2017 and challenged once for the Commonwealth super lightweight title in 2014.

Career
From Huddersfield, Nurse made his professional debut in March 2008 with a win over Kristian Laight. After winning his first 20 fights he competed in the Prizefighter tournament in 2012, losing in the final to Adil Anwar, his first defeat as a professional. Nurse was born to an English father and a Jamaican mother.

In February 2013 he stopped Joe Elfidh in the second round to take the vacant BBBofC Central Area super lightweight title, and in September 2013 was due to face Shayne Singleton for the vacant English title. Singleton pulled out of the fight after failing to make the weight, with Nurse beating late replacement Krzysztof Szot on points. In April 2014 he got his title shot and beat Tyler Goodjohn by unanimous decision to take it.

In October 2014 he faced Dave Ryan for the vacant Commonwealth super lightweight title, losing narrowly on points. 

With the British title having been vacated by Willie Limond, Nurse faced Chris Jenkins for the title in July 2015 at the Manchester Arena, the fight ending as a majority draw. They met again in November with Nurse getting a unanimous decision to become British champion.

Professional boxing record

{|class="wikitable" style="text-align:center"
|-
!
!Result
!Record
!Opponent
!Type
!Round, time
!Date
!Location
!Notes
|-
|46
|Loss
|37–7–2
|align=left|Kerman Lejarraga
|PTS
|10
|8 Aug 2020
|align=left|
|
|-
|45
|Win
|37–6–2
|align=left|Fernando Valencia
|PTS
|6
|20 Sep 2019
|align=left|
|
|-
|44
|Win
|36–6–2
|align=left|Óscar Amador
|PTS
|6
|5 Jul 2019
|align=left|
|
|-
|43
|Loss
|35–6–2
|align=left|Ekow Essuman
|MD
|10
|16 Mar 2019
|align=left|
|align=left|
|-
|42
|Loss
|35–5–2
|align=left|Liam Taylor
|SD
|10
|17 Nov 2018
|align=left|
|
|-
|41
|Loss
|35–4–2
|align=left|Jack Brubaker
|UD
|12
|24 May 2018
|align=left|
|
|-
|40
|Loss
|35–3–2
|align=left|Jack Catterall
|UD
|12
|21 Oct 2017
|align=left|
|align=left|
|-
|39
|Win
|35–2–2
|align=left|Andy Keates
|PTS
|8
|13 May 2017
|align=left|
|
|-
|38
|Draw
|34–2–2
|align=left|Joe Hughes
|SD
|12
|22 Apr 2017
|align=left|
|align=left|
|-
|37
|Win
|34–2–1
|align=left|Tommy Coyle
|UD
|12
|30 Jul 2017
|align=left|
|align=left|
|-
|36
|Win
|33–2–1
|align=left|Willie Limond
|TKO
|9 (12) 
|28 May 2016
|align=left|
|align=left|
|-
|35
|Win
|32–2–1
|align=left|Chris Jenkins
|UD
|12
|21 Nov 2015
|align=left|
|align=left|
|-
|34
|Draw
|31–2–1
|align=left|Chris Jenkins
|MD
|12
|18 Jul 2015
|align=left|
|align=left|
|-
|33
|Win
|31–2
|align=left|Liam Taylor
|UD
|10
|11 Apr 2015
|align=left|
|
|-
|32
|Win
|30–2
|align=left|Radoslav Mitev
|KO
|4 (6) 
|28 Nov 2014
|align=left|
|
|-
|31
|Loss
|29–2
|align=left|Dave Ryan
|MD
|12
|4 Oct 2014
|align=left|
|align=left|
|-
|30
|Win
|29–1
|align=left|Danny Little
|PTS
|6
|21 May 2014
|align=left|
|
|-
|29
|Win
|28–1
|align=left|Tyler Goodjohn
|UD
|10
|19 Apr 2014
|align=left|
|align=left|
|-
|28
|Win
|27–1
|align=left|Krysztof Szot 
|PTS
|8
|20 Sep 2013
|align=left|
|
|-
|27
|Win
|26–1
|align=left|Mark McKray
|PTS
|6
|1 Jun 2013
|align=left|
|
|-
|26
|Win
|25–1
|align=left|Joe Elfidh
|TKO
|2 (10), 
|15 Feb 2013
|align=left|
|align=left|
|-
|25
|Win
|24–1
|align=left|Santos Medrano
|PTS
|8
|20 Oct 2012
|align=left|
|
|-
|24
|Win
|23–1
|align=left|Karoly Lakatos
|PTS
|6
|30 Jun 2012
|align=left|
|
|-
|23
|Loss
|22–1
|align=left|Adil Anwar
|UD
|3
|11 Feb 2012
|align=left|
|align=left|
|-
|22
|Win
|22–0
|align=left|Young Mutley
|UD
|3
|11 Feb 2012
|align=left|
|align=left|
|-
|21
|Win
|21–0
|align=left|Dale Miles
|TKO
|3 (3), 
|11 Feb 2012
|align=left|
|align=left|
|-
|20
|Win
|20–0
|align=left|Ivar Godor
|PTS
|6
|11 Nov 2011
|align=left|
|
|-
|19
|Win
|19–0
|align=left|Istvan Kiss
|TKO
|5 (6), 
|8 Oct 2011
|align=left|
|
|-
|18
|Win
|18–0
|align=left|Ben Lawler
|RTD
|4 (6), 
|23 Jul 2011
|align=left|
|
|-
|17
|Win
|17–0
|align=left|William Warburton
|PTS
|6
|21 May 2011
|align=left|
|
|-
|16
|Win
|16–0
|align=left|Damian Owen
|PTS
|6
|5 Mar 2011
|align=left|
|
|-
|15
|Win
|15–0
|align=left|Julius Rafael
|PTS
|4
|2 Dec 2010
|align=left|
|
|-
|14
|Win
|14–0
|align=left|Ibrar Riyaz
|PTS
|10
|9 Oct 2010
|align=left|
|
|-
|13
|Win
|13–0
|align=left|Johnny Greaves
|TKO
|5 (6), 
|28 May 2010
|align=left|
|
|-
|12
|Win
|12–0
|align=left|Adam Kelly
|PTS
|6
|5 Mar 2010
|align=left|
|
|-
|11
|Win
|11–0
|align=left|William Warburton
|PTS
|6
|6 Dec 2009
|align=left|
|
|-
|10
|Win
|10–0
|align=left|Jason Nesbitt
|PTS
|6
|31 Oct 2009
|align=left|
|
|-
|9
|Win
|9–0
|align=left|Daniel Thorpe
|PTS
|4
|11 Sep 2009
|align=left|
|
|-
|8
|Win
|8–0
|align=left|Ibrar Riyaz
|PTS
|4
|25 May 2009
|align=left|
|
|-
|7
|Win
|7–0
|align=left|Johnny Greaves
|PTS
|4
|17 Apr 2009
|align=left|
|
|-
|6
|Win
|6–0
|align=left|Baz Carey
|PTS
|4
|27 Feb 2009
|align=left|
|
|-
|5
|Win
|5–0
|align=left|Sid Razak 
|PTS
|4
|21 Dec 2008
|align=left|
|
|-
|4
|Win
|4–0
|align=left|Fred Janes
|PTS
|4
|4 Dec 2008
|align=left|
|
|-
|3
|Win
|3–0
|align=left|Carl Allen
|PTS
|4
|28 Sep 2008
|align=left|
|
|-
|2
|Win
|2–0
|align=left|Carl Allen
|PTS
|4
|5 Sep 2008
|align=left|
|
|-
|1
|Win
|1–0
|align=left|Kristian Laight
|PTS
|4
|28 Mar 2008
|align=left|
|
|-

References

External links

1990 births
Living people
English male boxers
Light-welterweight boxers
Sportspeople from Huddersfield